Pherbellia tenuipes is a species of marsh fly (insects in the family Sciomyzidae).

References

Sciomyzidae
Articles created by Qbugbot
Insects described in 1872